is Rimi Natsukawa's debut album, released on . The title of the album is in Okinawan (Uchinaaguchi).

Background

The album is Natsukawa's first full-length album release, after her EP Minamikaze released earlier in the year. Both releases feature her hit single, "Nada Sōsō." The album is formulated of four original songs and seven cover tracks. This continues with the structure of "Minamikaze," which consisted of six covers and an original track.

Three singles were released before the album, however  and  do not feature. They were released onto Rimi Natsukawa Single Collection Vol. 1 in 2005.

Song sources

The songs on the album relate to Okinawa in some way, either being written by Okinawan musicians, describe Okinawa or are written in the style of Okinawan songs. "Asadoya Yunta" and "Akata Sundunchi" are traditional folk songs, while "Famureuta," "Nada Sōsō" and "Tsuki no Yoru" were written by famous Okinawan bands (Parsha Club, Begin and Kiroro respectively). Shima Uta was written by Japanese band The Boom on their impressions of Okinawa when visiting it.

"Akahana Hitotsu," "Kokoro no Katachi," "Rakuen (Makaru Sari)" and "Tsuki no Kaori" are original compositions. "Akahana Hitotsu" was written by Begin guitarist Masaru Shimabukuro.

Track listing

Japan sales rankings

References

Rimi Natsukawa albums
2002 debut albums
Victor Entertainment albums